Lee Summers (born 1958) is an American theatre, television and film actor, singer, librettist, composer, director and theatre producer best known for creating and producing Off-Broadway's From My Hometown.
As a director, Summers is a two-time winner of both 2022 and 2018 Audelco Awards for 'Best Director of a Musical' for "Ella, First Lady of Song" and "On Kentucky Avenue," respectively. As an actor, Summers was nominated for the 2018 Audelco Award for 'Best Featured Actor in a Musical,' for "On Kentucky Avenue. "Summers has appeared on Broadway and in numerous TV/Film roles, such as Core FOI (Fruit of Islam) in Malcolm X, a neurosurgeon on Law & Order; a turn-of-the-century cook on Boardwalk Empire, and as a Police Sergeant, opposite Tom Selleck on Blue Bloods.

Early life and career 

Born in Nashville, Tennessee, Summers' first professional job was performing on the Showboat at Opryland USA while enrolled at Tennessee State University. An opportunity to tour singing the role of "Porgy" in Gershwin's Porgy and Bess prompted Summers to leave TSU during his senior year. After the tour, Summers moved to New York (1980) where, on his first night in Manhattan, he'd meet choreographer Michael Peters (Dreamgirls, Beat It). After a couple of years performing in numerous Off and Off-Off Broadway shows, Summers made his Broadway debut in the original production of Dreamgirls. Years later, Summers reprised the role he played in the Original Dreamgirls for the Dreamgirls 20th Anniversary Benefit Concert with Lillias White, Billy Porter, Audra McDonald, Norm Lewis and Heather Headley. Later, at the invitation of Broadway vocal arranger Chapman Roberts (Five Guys Named Moe), Summers performed at Carnegie Hall.

In 1986, after a stint performing in Monte Carlo with Jenifer Lewis, Summers returned to work on a one-man show in Indiana, where when traveling one night he suffered a near-fatal car accident. On his journey to a full recovery, his voice as a stage writer emerged, leading to his creating and performing in what would become the Off-Broadway hit, From My Hometown.

Writing led to Summers joining the Dramatists Guild of America, and his work or incarnations thereof, have been produced and presented On and Off-Broadway, at numerous regional theatres such as the Milwaukee Repertory, where Summers collaborated with Kevin Ramsey to premiere their original tap-dance musical, If These Shoes Could Talk, which starred Harold Nicholas, of the legendary Nicholas Brothers, in his farewell stage performance.

Other venues and regional theatres where Summers' works have been produced include The Arkansas Repertory Theatre, The Ensemble Theatre, Karamu Theatre, The Phoenix Theatre, The Meadow Brook Theatre, The Madison Theatre at Molloy College, Theaterworks in Palo Alto, California, The Triad Theatre, New World Stages, AMAS Musical Theatre, Crossroads Theatre, RACCA's Seaport Salon, The Kirk Theatre, Gramercy Theatre, Radio City Music Hall's workshop spaces, The Kennedy Center and many others.

Other notable projects in development include Summers as librettist, co-lyricist and co-composer (with the late, Timothy Graphenreed) for Yo' Alice (Adaptation of Alice in Wonderland) which was conceived by Maurice Hines. Summers also collaborated with Hines on an Ella Fitzgerald musical, Ella: First Lady of Song for which Summers is book writer. Ella: First Lady of Song premiered at New Jersey's Crossroads Theatre in 2004 and in 2014, was produced in Alexandria, VA starring Freda Payne (Hit record: Band of Gold) and most recently in Wilmington, Delaware 2018, directed by Maurice Hines.

Summers' funk musical, The Funkentine Rapture, was selected for the 2005 National Alliance for Musical Theatre Festival (NAMT) starring Tony Award Winner Billy Porter and presented in workshop at Theatreworks (Silicon Valley), directed by Robert Kelly. The Funkentine Rapture was presented in concert at 54 Below in June 2017, starring Tony Award Winners, James Monroe Iglehart and Lillias White.

Summers made his producing debut in 2003—partnering with Amas Musical theatre and Ben Blake for the developmental production of From My Hometown. The production transferred commercially to the Gramercy Theatre in 2004 with Summers as Lead Producer.

Summers has worked in venues ranging from New York's Urban Stages, AMAS Musical Theatre, The John Houseman Theatre, New World Stages, The Triad Theatre, Flushing Town Hall, The Milwaukee Repertory Theater, The Cell Theatre, Harlem Repertory Theatre, The Pearl Theatre Company to name a few. Summers directed the World Premiere of "Acappella The Musical" for the New York Musical Theatre Festival (NYMF) garnering three "Excellence Awards" in 2015.

In 2016 Summers celebrated the 10th Anniversary of his Just A Piano Concert Series, which has presented countless artists benefiting numerous charities, such as Broadway Cares/Equity Fights AIDS, Actors Fund of America, MusiCares and others.

Summers studied Theatre at Tennessee State University and earned his Bachelor of Arts in Theatre and Dramatic Writing from SUNY Empire State College. He has an MFA in musical theatre writing from New York University/Tisch School of the Arts.

Work

Librettist 

 1993 If These Shoes Could Talk(Co-librettist)
 1998 'From My Hometown (Conceiver) (Co-librettist)
 1999 Yo Alice(Librettist)
 2004 Ella Fitzgerald: First Lady of Song(Librettist)
 2005 The Funkentine Rapture(Co-librettist)
 2013 The System (Librettist)
 2014 Ella Fitzgerald: First Lady of Song(Librettist)
 2018 Pangaea The Musical
(Librettist)
 2018 Ella Fitzgerald: First Lady of Song
(Librettist)

Lyricist 

 1993 If These Shoes Could Talk (Co-lyricist)
 1998 From My Hometown (Conceiver) (Co-lyricist) (Lyricist)
 1999 Yo Alice(Co-lyricist)
 2005 The Funkentine Rapture (Lyricist)
 2010 Winds of Change (Co-lyricist) (Lyricist)
 2013 The System(Co-lyricist) (Lyricist)
 2016 Bayard The Musical (Lyricist)
 2018 Pangaea The Musical (Lyricist)

Composer 

 1993 If These Shoes Could Talk(Co-Composer)
 1998 From My Hometown (Conceiver) (Co-Composer)
 1999 Yo Alice (Co-Composer)
 2005 The Funkentine Rapture (Composer)
 2010 Winds of Change (Composer)
 2013 The System(Composer)
 2016 Bayard The Musical (Composer)

Playwright 

 2016 Poetics Justice(Author) (Published)
 2013 One Shot Deal(Author) (Published)

Producer 

 2003 From My Hometown (Kirk Theatre, New York City)
 2004 From My Hometown (Gramercy Theatre, New York City
 2010 Winds of Change (Triad Theatre)

Television and film actor 

 1992 Malcolm X...Elijah Muhammad's FOI
 1994 Law and Order (TV Series)- Coma (1994) ... Dr. David Monroe
 1996 Law and Order (TV Series)- Causa Mortis (1996) ... Belmont Uniform Policeman
 1997 New York Undercover (TV Series)- Fade Out (1997) ... Walter Stokes
 2003 The presidents (PBS VIdeo)Colin Powell / Secret Service Man
 2011 Boardwalk Empire (TV Series) – Battle of the Century (2011) ... Otis
 2013 Blue Bloods (TV Series) – The City That Never Sleeps (2013) ... Sgt. Stiles

Stage actor and singer 

 1981 Dreamgirls (Original Broadway Production)
 2001 Dreamgirls 20th Anniversary(Broadway Event)
 2001 Little Ham(Off-Broadway)
 2010 Winds of Change(Cabaret – Bistro Award Winner)

Awards and competitions 

Summers' works have received critical acclaim along with such honors as The New Professional Theatre's "Our Voices Award" (1996) eight AUDELCO Award nominations including "Best Musical" (2003), selection and presentation in the National Alliance for Musical Theatre's Festival of New Musicals(2005), TheatreWorks in Palo Alto, California (2005), a developmental workshop at Radio City Musical Hall (1999), developmental support from the Shubert Organization (2003), a [[Gilman & Gonzalez-Falla]] Theatre Foundation Commendation for his body of work in American Musical Theater (2003), New York's Bistro Award(2010) and four Michigan 2012 Wilde Award nominations and a recent win for Best Ensemble (2012).

2010 Bistro Award winner 'Outstanding Achievement, Entertainer'

2018 Audelco Award Nomination and Winner for 'Best Director of a Musical,' for "On Kentucky Avenue"

2018 Audelco Award Nomination for 'Best Featured Actor in a Musical,' for "On Kentucky Avenue"

References 

1958 births
African-American composers
African-American dramatists and playwrights
African-American male composers
20th-century African-American male singers
American dramatists and playwrights
American librettists
American male singers
Living people
Male actors from Tennessee
People from Nashville, Tennessee
21st-century African-American people